ISO 10006:2018, Quality management systems - Guidelines for quality management in projects, is an international standard developed by the International Organization for Standardization.

ISO 10006:2018 gives guidance on the application of quality management in projects. It supersedes ISO 10006:2003.

Basic principles
ISO 10006  is applicable to organizations working on projects of varying complexity, small or large, of short or long duration, being an individual project to being part of a programme or portfolio of projects, in different environments, and irrespective of the kind of product/service or process involved, with the intention of satisfying project interested parties by introducing quality management in projects. This can necessitate some tailoring of the guidance to suit a particular project.

ISO 10006 defines a project as "unique process undertaken to achieve an objective". A project generally consists of a set of coordinated and controlled activities with start and finish dates, conforming to specific requirements, including the constraints of time, cost and resources.

Linked standards
ISO 10006 is not a guide to "project management" itself. Guidance on quality in project management processes is discussed in this International Standard. Guidance on quality in a project's product-related processes, and on the "process approach", is covered in ISO 9004.  A new "Project Management - Guide to project Management"  ISO 21500 has been published in September 2012.

Since ISO 10006 is a guidance document, it is not intended to be used for certification/registration purposes.

See also 
 Clinical trial
 List of ISO standards
 Project management
 Quality management system

External links
 Overview and discussion of the ISO 10006 Standard
 Combining the ISO 10006 and PMBOK To Ensure Successful Projects
 ISO 10006:2017 Standard

10006
Project management
Quality